Valencian Art Nouveau, is the historiographic denomination given to an art and literature movement associated with the Art Nouveau in the Valencian Community, in Spain.

Its main form of expression was in architecture, but many other arts were involved (painting, sculpture, etc.), and especially the design and the decorative arts (cabinetmaking, carpentry, forged iron, ceramic tiles, ceramics, etc.), which were particularly important, especially in their role as support to architecture.

Although Art Nouveau was part of a general trend that emerged in Europe around the turn of the 20th century, in the Valencian Community the trend acquired its own unique personality in the context of spectacular urban and industrial development. It is equivalent to a number of other fin de siècle art movements going by the names of Art Nouveau in France and Belgium, Jugendstil in Germany, Sezession in Austria-Hungary, Liberty style in Italy and Modern or Glasgow Style in Scotland.

The Valencian Art Nouveau was active from roughly 1899 (Art Nouveau reform of the Glorieta Park in Alcoy) to 1917. The Art Nouveau movement in the Valencian Community is best known for its architectural expression, especially in the works of the architects Demetrio Ribes Marco and Francisco Mora Berenguer in Valencia or Vicente Pascual Pastor and Timoteo Briet Montaud in Alcoy, but was also significant in sculpture and painting. Notable painters include Fernando Cabrera Cantó, Francisco Laporta Valor, Emilio Sala, Adolfo Morrió and Edmundo Jordá. A notable sculptor was Lorenzo Ridaura Gosálbez.

On the other hand, there are several Valencian populations who form part of the Art Nouveau European Route, an association of local governments and non-governmental institutions for the international promotion and protection of Art Nouveau heritage. It is the case of Alcoy, Novelda and Sueca.

Architecture 
Early 20th century architecture in Valencian Community was strongly influenced by European Art Nouveau. The Valencian Art Nouveau takes place in different cities or areas, inside of a context of great industrial, economic and urban development: Alcoy and Valencia, by number of works, will be the main Valencian cities where much more was developed the art nouveau architecture. Novelda, Alicante, Burriana, Castellón de la Plana or Sueca are other cities with important examples of Valencian Art Nouveau architecture.

With Valencian local architects, all of them formed in Barcelona or Madrid and contemporaries to the Catalan Modernism and to the Art Nouveau of Madrid, but that exercised the main part of his career in the Valencian Community, the Valencian Art Nouveau will receive a special architectural relevancy in different Valencian cities.

The Mercado Central in Valencia, one of the largest in Europe, covers more than 8,000 square metres, over two floors, with a predominantly Valencian Art Nouveau style. Its unusual roof comprises original domes and sloping sections at different heights, while the interior seems to be lined in a range of materials such as iron, wood, ceramics and polychromed tiles. The beauty of the building stands out especially on account of the light that enters through the roof at various points, and through coloured window panels.

The Estación del Norte is the main railway station in Valencia located in the city centre next to the Plaza de Toros de Valencia. It was declared Good of Cultural Heritage in 1987.

The Mercado de Colón is a public market located in the city center of Valencia. The building was designed by the Valencian architect Francisco Mora Berenguer between 1914 and 1916. This is a clear example of Valencian Art Nouveau architecture of the early century. It was declared a national monument. It impresses with its extraordinary facade and lavish decor.

Main buildings of the Valencian Art Nouveau 
Between the works of the Valencian modernisme stand out:

Province of Alicante

Alcoy (by districts) 

City Center
 Casa del Pavo
 Casa d'Escaló
 Circulo Industrial de Alcoy
 Casa Laporta
 Campus of Alcoy of the Technical University of Valencia
 Casa Vilaplana
 Casa Briet
 Canalejas Viaduct
 Monte de Piedad y Caja de Ahorros de Alcoy
 Casa Mataix
 Edificio en calle Sant Llorenç 3
 Edificio en calle Sant Llorenç 5
 Edificio en calle Sant Llorenç 27
 Edificio en calle Sant Nicolau 4
 Edificio en calle Sant Nicolau 29
 Edificio en calle Sant Nicolau 35
 Cocheras en plaza Emili Sala 12
 Edificio en avenida País Valencià 30
 Edificio en calle Capellà Belloch 9
 Edificio en calle Sant Josep 26
 Edificios en calle Pintor Casanova 16, 18 y 20
 Edificios en calle Bartolomé José Gallardo 1, 3 y 5
 La Glorieta de Alcoy
 Fábricas en calle Sant Joan 43 y 45
 Edificio del Parque de Bomberos
 Kiosk of Art Nouveau style at the Plaza de la Constitución
Ensanche-Santa Rosa
 Hydroelectrics substation of Alcoy
 Taller de carruajes en calle Agres 5
 Fábrica en calle Agres 8
 Fábrica en calle Alcoleja 4
 Slaughterhouse of Alcoy
El Camí-Zona Alta
 Casa El Camí 1
 Fábrica de "El Rosendo"
 Fábrica en calle Sant Vicent Ferrer 12
Outskirts
 Fuente de El Molinar de Alcoy
 Alcoy Cemetery, Art nouveau pantheons and sculptures.

Alicante 
 Central Market of Alicante
 Lonja del Pescado
 Casa Lamaignere
 Casa Carbonell
 Casa del Ascensor
 Edificio Torrent
 Casa Campos Carrera
 Casa de las Brujas

Novelda: 
 Santuario de Santa María Magdalena
 Art Nouveau House-Museum
 Centro Cultural Gómez-Tortosa
 Sociedad Cultural Casino de Novelda
 Casa Mira

Orihuela: 
 Casa Villaescusa
 Teatro Circo
 Lonja de Orihuela

Torrevieja:
 Casino de Torrevieja

Villena: 
 Chapí Theatre

Province of Castellón 
Les Alqueries:
 Chalé de Safont

Benicarló: 
 Casa Bosch

Benicàssim:
 Villa Victoria

Burriana:
 Orange Museum
 Circulo Frutero Burrianense

Castellón de la Plana 
 Edificio de Correos de Castellón
 Casa de les Cigonyes
 Casa Dávalos
 Casa Alcón
 Edificio Academia la Purísima
 Transformador de Viuda de Estela
 Quiosco modernista de la plaza de la Paz

Vila-real:
 Almacén de Cabrera

Vinaròs:
 Casa Giner
 Casa Sendra

Province of Valencia 
Alfafar:
 Sindicato Arrocero de Alfafar

Alginet:
 Market of Alginet
 Slaughterhouse of Alginet

Almàssera:
 Casa Llopis

Alzira: 
 Almacén de los hermanos Peris Puig
 Círculo Alcireño

Bocairent
 Hotel L'Ágora

Carcaixent
 Almacén de José Ribera
 Market of Carcaixent
 Casa Vernich
 Casa Talens

Catadau:
 Centro Católico Social

Cullera:
 Market of Cullera

Foios:
 Escuelas Municipales de Foios

Gandia:
 Palace París
 Serrano Theater

Ontinyent:
 Hotel Kazar

Requena:
 Finca Casa Nueva

Sueca: 
 Asilo de ancianos de Sueca
 Ateneo Suecano del Socorro
 Casa de Pascual Fos
 Escuelas Jardín del Ateneo
 Casas de Ignacia Cardona
 Slaughterhouse of Sueca

Valencia (by districts) 

Ciutat Vella-City Center
 North Station
 Central Market of Valencia
 Casa Ordeig
 General post office (Correos)
 Edificio Suay
 Casa Noguera
 Casa Ernesto Ferrer
 Casa Boldún
 Casa Bigné
 Hotel Reina Victoria
 Edificio Aznar
 Casa Tarín
 Edificio Lucini
 Casa del Punto de Gancho
 Palacio de Fuentehermosa
 Casa Peris
 Edificio Monforte
 Edificio Sánchez de León
 Casa Sancho
 Edificio Grau
 Edificio Gómez I
 Edificio Gómez II
 Hotel Palace
 Edificio Bolinches
 Edificio Olympia
 Cinematógrafos Caro
L'Eixample
 Mercado de Colón
 Edificio Ferrer
 Edificio Cortina I
 Edificio Francisco Sancho
 Casa Ortega
 Casa de las Golondrinas
 Casa de los Dragones
 Edificio Chapa
 Edificio Cortina Pérez
 Casa de Salvador Llop
 Casa Manuel Peris
 Edificio Peris
Exposició-Mestalla
 Valencia Regional Exhibition
 Light fountain of the Exposición Regional Valenciana
 Bridge of the Exposición Regional Valenciana 1909  
 Palace of the Exposición
 Industria Lanera Valenciana
 Edificio de Tabacalera
 Balneario de la Alameda
Port of Valencia-El Cabanyal
 Tinglados del Puerto de Valencia
 Edificio del Reloj
 Casa Calabuig
 Hospital asilo de San Juan de Dios
 Lonja de Pescado del Cabanyal
 El Casinet
 Casa Ribes
 House-Museum Blasco Ibáñez
Ayora
 Palace of Ayora
L'Olivereta-Nou Moles
 Convent of Santa Clara
 Central Eléctrica de Nou Moles

Vilanova de Castelló
 Asilo de Santo Domingo
 Mercado de Vilanova de Castelló

Xàtiva: 
 Edificio Botella

Valencian Art Nouveau architects 

The main architects of the Valencian Art Nouveau movement by each city are:

Province of Alicante 
 Alcoy: Vicente Pascual Pastor, Timoteo Briet Montaud, Alfonso Dubé, Enrique Vilaplana Juliá, Jorge Vilaplana Carbonell, José Cort Merita, José Abad Carbonell and Joaquín Aracil Aznar.
 Alicante: Francisco Fajardo Guardiola, Juan Vidal Ramos, Enrique Sánchez Sedeño and José Guardiola Picó.
 Novelda: José Sala Sala and Pedro Cerdán.
 Orihuela: Severiano Sánchez Ballesta
 Torrevieja: José Guardiola Picó
 Villena: José María Manuel Cortina Pérez

Province of Castellón 
 Castellón de la Plana: Demetrio Ribes Marco, Godofredo Ros de Ursinos and José Gimeno Almela.
 Vila-real: José Gimeno Almela

Province of Valencia 
 Alginet: Carlos Carbonell Pañella
 Alzira: Emilio Ferrer Gisbert
 Bocairent: Joaquín Aracil Aznar
 Carcaixent: José Ríos Chinesta
 Catadau: Enrique Viedma Vidal
 Cullera: Luis Ferreres Soler
 Foios: Ramón Lucini Callejo
 Gandia: Víctor Beltrí.
 Requena: Demetrio Ribes Marco
 Sueca: Buenaventura Ferrando Castells and Joan Guardiola.
 Valencia: Francisco Mora Berenguer, Demetrio Ribes Marco, José María Manuel Cortina Pérez, Antonio Martorell Trilles, Vicente Ferrer Pérez, Emilio Ferrer Gisbert, Pelegrín Mustieles Cano, Manuel Peris Ferrando, Alexandre Soler, Francesc Guàrdia i Vial, Enrique Viedma Vidal, Manuel García Sierra, Vicente Rodríguez Martín, Ramón Lucini Callejo, Luis Ferreres Soler, Vicente Sancho Fuster, Carlos Carbonell Pañella, Lucas García Cardona, Francisco Almenar Quinzá, Joaquín María Arnau Miramón, Juan Bautista Gosálvez Navarro, etc.
 Villanueva de Castellón: Joaquín María Arnau Miramón y Carlos Carbonell Pañella.

See also 
 Art Nouveau in Alcoy
 Valencian Gothic

References

Bibliography 

 Mestre Martí, María. (2007). La arquitectura del modernismo valenciano en relación con el Jugendstil vienés. 1898-1918. Paralelismos y conexiones.. Universitat Politècnica de València.
 De Soto Arandiga, Concepción. (2012). "Arquitectos y arquitecturas modernistas en la ciudad de Valencia 1900-1915. Valencia ante el modernismo" Real Academia de Cultura Valenciana.
 Colomer Sendra, Vicente (2002). Colegio Oficial de Arquitectos de la Comunidad Valenciana, ed. Registro de Arquitectura del Siglo XX en la Comunidad Valenciana (en castellano/valenciano). p. 719. .
 Doménech Romá, Jorge (2010). Modernismo en Alcoy, su contexto histórico y los oficios artesanales. Editorial Aguaclara. p. 497. .
 Doménech Romá, Jorge (2013). Del Modernismo al Funcionalismo, características y evolución del movimiento modernista, el modernismo en Alcoy y Novelda (casos concretos). Publicaciones de la Universidad de Alicante. p. 224. .
 Jaén i Urban, Gaspar (1999). Instituto de Cultura Juan Gil-Albert, Colegio Territorial de Arquitectos de Alicante, ed. Guía de arquitectura de la provincia de Alicante. p. 311. .

External links 
 
 "Valencian Art Nouveau". Valencia City Council.
 The Valencian Art Nouveau by Las Provincias
 "Valencia ante el modernismo" by Concepción de Soto Arandiga. RACV
 Alcoy at the Art Nouveau European Route 

Art Nouveau architecture in the Valencian Community